Zerfall is the first studio album by the German dark metal band Eisregen, released through Last Episode in 1998.

Track listing
 "... und über allem weht der Wind so kalt (Pest I)" – 6:39
 "Legende des Leides (Pest II)" – 4:30
 "In der Grube (Pest III)" – 2:23
 "Auferstehung (Pest IV)" – 4:42
 "Ich bin viele" – 2:26
 "Eispalast" – 3:25
 "Ode an den Niedergang" – 1:29
 "Herzblut" – 5:54
 "Endzeit" – 5:19

Das Ende des Weges
Re-released by Massacre Records with the demo Das Ende des Weges, in 2004. 
 "Einklang: Demo '96 "Das Ende des Weges""  – 0:13
 "Blut ist Leben"  – 2:11
 "Eispalast"  – 3:34
 "Zeitenwende"  – 3:50
 "Herzblut"  – 6:56
 "Nichts wäret ewiglich"  – 6:00
 "Ode an den Niedergang"  – 2:11
 "Zu Ehren meiner dunklen Königin"  – 3:45
 "Ich bin das Tor"  – 7:11
 "Ausklang"  – 0:07

Credits
 Michael "Blutkehle" Roth – vocals
 Michael "Bursche" Lenz – guitar
 K. Matthes – bass
 Daniel "DF" Fröbing – keyboard
 Ronny "Yantit" Fimmel – drums

References

1998 debut albums
Eisregen albums